Brunello Rondi (26 November 1924 – 7 November 1989) was a prolific Italian screen writer and film director best known for his frequent script collaborations with Federico Fellini.

His brother, Gian Luigi Rondi, was an Italian film critic.

Biography 
Noted chiefly as a script-writer and script consultant, Rondi began his film career with the script for 1947's Last Love for which he was also assistant director.

He worked as assistant director as well as an uncredited writer on The Flowers of St. Francis (1950) by Roberto Rossellini and was a credited writer on Rossellini's Europa '51 (1952).

He started to work with Federico Fellini as artistic director on La Strada (1954) and Nights of Cabiria (1957). His most prized collaborations were on the film scripts of La Dolce Vita (1960), 8½ (1963), Juliet of the Spirits (1964), Orchestra Rehearsal (1978), and City of Women (1980), all co-written and directed by Fellini.

On the writing of La Dolce Vita, Rondi helped build up the character of Steiner, the intellectual who kills his wife and children. As a Fellini intimate, Rondi also played a crucial role in the early stages of 8½. In a letter dated October 1960, Fellini outlined his initial ideas to Rondi that were later developed into the screenplay with co-writers Ennio Flaiano and Tullio Pinelli.

He made his directorial debut with Violent Life in 1961 based on the novel by Pier Paolo Pasolini.

He died of a heart attack in Rome in 1989. He was 64 years old.

Filmography

Director and scriptwriter 
 Violent Life, co-directed with Paolo Heusch (1961)
 Il demonio (1963)
 Domani non siamo più qui (1967)
 Run, Psycho, Run (1968)
 Le tue mani sul mio corpo (1970)
 Valeria dentro e fuori (1972)
 Racconti proibiti... di niente vestiti (1972)
 Ingrid sulla strada (1973)
 Tecnica di un amore (1973)
 Prigione di donne (1974)
 Smooth Velvet, Raw Silk (1976)
 I prosseneti (1976)
 La vocazione di Suor Teresa (1982)

Screenplays 
  Last Love, directed by Luigi Chiarini (1947)
 The Flowers of St. Francis - uncredited, directed by Roberto Rossellini (1950)
 Altri tempi, directed by Alessandro Blasetti (1952)
 Europa '51, directed by Roberto Rossellini (1952)
 Era notte a Roma, directed by Roberto Rossellini (1960)
 La Dolce Vita, directed by Federico Fellini (1960)
 Boccaccio 70, episode The Temptation of Doctor Antonio, directed by Federico Fellini (1962)
 8½, directed by Federico Fellini (1963)
 Juliet of the Spirits, directed by Federico Fellini (1965)
 Amanti, directed by Vittorio De Sica (1968)
 Scacco alla regina, directed by Pasquale Festa Campanile (1969)
 Fellini Satyricon, directed by Federico Fellini (1969)
 Le sorelle, directed by Roberto Malenotti (1969)
 Orchestra Rehearsal, directed by Federico Fellini (1978)
 City of Women, directed by Federico Fellini (1980)

Director 
 Tecnica di un amore (1973)

Assistant director 
 Last Love, directed by Luigi Chiarini (1947)
 Francesco, giullare di Dio - directed by Roberto Rossellini (1950)
 L'ultimo amante, directed by Mario Mattoli (1955)

Actor 
 Le ore dell'amore, directed by Luciano Salce (1963)
 Colpo di stato, directed by Luciano Salce (1969)

Notes

References
 Alpert, Hollis (1988). Fellini: A Life. New York: Paragon House. 
 Bondanella, Peter (1992). The Cinema of Federico Fellini. Princeton University Press. 
 Parigi, Stefania e Alberto Pezzotta (2010). Il lungo respiro di Brunello Rondi (prefazione di Gian Luigi Rondi). Roma: Edizioni Sabinae.

Bibliography 
 Alberto Pezzotta, Stefania Parigi, Il lungo respiro di Brunello Rondi, Sabinae editions, 2010

External links 

1924 births
1989 deaths
20th-century Italian screenwriters
Italian male screenwriters
Italian film directors
Italian male film actors
People from the Province of Sondrio
Male actors from Rome
20th-century Italian male actors
20th-century Italian male writers